Kamena is a village in Petrich Municipality, in Blagoevgrad Province, Bulgaria. The Greek name of village is "Κάμινα". As of 2013, it had a population of 278.

References

Villages in Blagoevgrad Province